The 1916 United States presidential election in Delaware took place on November 7, 1916. All 48 contemporary states participated in the 1916 United States presidential election. Voters chose three electors to the Electoral College, which selected the president and vice president.

Republican nominee and Supreme Court justice Charles Evans Hughes carried Delaware with 50.20% of the vote, defeating Democratic nominee and incumbent president Woodrow Wilson, who won 47.78% of the vote. This election marks one of three times in the 20th century that the state voted for the losing candidate, along with 1932 and 1948.

Results

See also
 United States presidential elections in Delaware

References

Delaware
1916
1916 Delaware elections